Abacus Data Systems, doing business as Caret (formerly AbacusNext) is an American software and private cloud services provider headquartered in San Diego, California.

Services and software
AbacusNext offers the following:

Cloud
Abacus Private Cloud is a private cloud sold as Desktop-as-a-Service within a Windows Server 2012 R2 environment. This service relies on Veeam Software for backup support, and is built on Intel-based architecture.

This private cloud service is colocated across three carrier-neutral data centers that are interconnected via a self-run optical network. These data centers are Scalematrix in San Diego, California, Skybox Houston One in Houston, Texas, and SUPERNAP by Switch in Las Vegas, Nevada.

Software
AbacusNext offers four Windows-based platforms, all of which rely on relational database management system's. Two are law practice management software for lawyers; AbacusLaw uses Advantage Database, while Amicus Attorney uses Microsoft SQL Server. AbacusNext has two platforms for accounting firms that rely on Microsoft SQL Server: ResultsCRM, a customer relationship management for QuickBooks, and OfficeTools practice management software.

Management
Keri Gohman, CEO  (previously a partner at Bain Capital Ventures)
Mike Skelly, CFO (former CFO of Trio Health, UpWind Solutions, and Active Network)

In December 2015, American private equity investment firm Providence Equity Partners took a strategic majority investment in AbacusNext (Abacus Data Systems at that time).

Acquisitions
May 2016: acquired Toronto-based software company Gavel & Gown, makers of Amicus Attorney.
February 2017: acquired Virginia-based software company Results Software, makers of ResultsCRM.
February 2017: acquired San Diego-based cloud hosting provider Cloudnine Realtime.
May 2017: acquired Palmdale-based software company OfficeTools.
November 2017: acquired Scotland-based software company HotDocs. HotDocs was previously owned by LexisNexis before being sold in 2009. 
December 2017: acquired New Hampshire-based software company Commercial Logic.

References

External links
 Official website

Software companies of the United States
Cloud applications
Cloud computing providers
Companies established in 1983
Software companies based in California
Technology companies based in San Diego